"Yoakemade Borderless" (Japanese: "夜明けまでボーダレス" or "夜明けまでBorderless," also known as "Borderless") is the debut single by Japanese Brazilian singer Carlos Toshiki, released on November 28, 1991 by WEA Japan. The single charted at No. 97 on the Oricon charts.

Background and composition 
Since the disbandment of Toshiki's previous band, Carlos Toshiki & Omega Tribe, in 1991, "Yoakemade Borderless" is the first single released since the song "Lucia" in 1982. The single was written by Masako Arikawa and composed by Tsunehiro Izumi, both of whom worked for Carlos Toshiki & Omega Tribe as well as the previous incarnation of the band, 1986 Omega Tribe. The jacket uses a photo of Carlos's eyes only.

Track listing

Soundtrack appearances 
Both the A-side and the B-side were included in Toshiki's debut album, Emotion – Migigawa no Heart-tachi e.
In the Joint Omega Tribe album Kiyotaka Sugiyama Omega Tribe Best & Best, the single was included in the album.
The song was included in the compilation City Pop Best Selection.
The song was remixed by future funk producer Vantage.

Charts

References 

1992 singles
1991 songs